I Kill My Heart is the third studio album by Tommy heavenly6. It was released on April 29, 2009, and was Kawase's final album with DefSTAR Records. "I Kill My Heart" is a concept album in which Tommy heavenly6 uses a less energetic and darker sound than on previous albums, and each track was played by the same backing band.

Track listing

Music videos

Although no singles were released for the album, two music videos were released for I Kill My Heart: "Wait for Me There", and "Leaving You". Two versions of each video were released: one featuring Tommy heavenly6 and one featuring Tommy february6. All four of the videos used the same set and similar themes, although the February6 versions feature a more upbeat attitude.
The "Wait for Me There" video uses a tea party setting inspired by Alice in Wonderland, as well as a "pumpkin graveyard" and fashion runway. The "Leaving You" video is inspired by the androgyny of 1970's Glam Rock.

Reception

"I Kill My Heart" received mixed reviews from critics. Adam Greenberg of Allmusic stated "The songs aren't landmarks of grunge writing by any measure, but within the context of normally bubbly Japanese pop (including the happier alter ego Tommy february6), an album like "I Kill My Heart" holds secrets that haven't been spread into the territory before". The album reached number 9 on the Oricon charts in the first week of its release.

Personnel
 Tomoko Kawase – Vocals
 Chiffon Brownie – Guitar
 Satoshi 'Anthony' Yamada – Bass
 Yasuo Sano – Drums

Notes
 Credits adapted from album's liner notes.

References

2009 albums
Tomoko Kawase albums